The Brice is a historic building at 601 East Bay Street in Savannah, Georgia, United States. The building, which is in the Savannah Historic District (itself on the National Register of Historic Places), dates to 1860. At , it takes up an entire city block (the northeastern residential tything block) of Washington Square, in what was Savannah's Old Fort neighborhood.

A former livery stable, cotton warehouse and (from the early 1900s) Savannah's first Coca-Cola bottling plant,"Hotel Review: The Brice in Savannah" – New York Times, June 25, 2015 it was converted into a series of hotels, the previous one being the Mulberry Inn, a Holiday Inn franchise, in 1982. It has been occupied since 2014 by the 145-room Kimpton Brice Hotel. (Brice is Gaelic for brick.)The Brice – Green Line Architecture

See also
Buildings in Savannah Historic District

References

External links
 The Kimpton Brice Hotel official website
 View of the building from Bay Street – Google Street View, January 2019
 View of the building from Houston Street and East Bryan Street – Google Street View, May 2019

Kimpton hotels
Hotels in Savannah, Georgia
Washington Square (Savannah) buildings
Commercial buildings completed in 1860
1860 establishments in Georgia (U.S. state)
Greek Revival architecture in Georgia (U.S. state)
Hotel buildings completed in 1860
Hotels established in 1982
Savannah Historic District